Hazen Elmer "Hank" Myers (October 22, 1934 – May 24, 2021) was a Canadian politician. He served in the Legislative Assembly of New Brunswick from 1978 to 1987 and from 1991 to 1995, as a Progressive Conservative member for the constituency of Kings East.

References

Progressive Conservative Party of New Brunswick MLAs
1934 births
2021 deaths
People from Kings County, New Brunswick